Lymnaea acuminata is a species of freshwater snail in the family Lymnaeidae. It is native to South Asia, where it occurs in Bangladesh, Burma, India, Nepal, and Pakistan. There it is a widespread and common species.

Biology
This snail lives in water bodies such as lakes, streams, and wetlands with thick vegetation. It easily survives in polluted waters.

Parasites 
Lymnaea acuminata is a host for many species of trematodes. It is the first intermediate host for Schistosoma nasale and S. spindale. It is also an intermediate host for the liver flukes Fasciola gigantica and F. hepatica, which cause the infectious disease fasciolosis in humans and other mammals.

References

Lymnaeidae
Gastropods described in 1822